Magnus Leif Michelsson (born 4 September 1968) is an Australian marathon runner. He won the Melbourne Marathon in 2003 and 2004.

His Melbourne Marathon winning margin in 2003 is the biggest male winning margin in the history of the race.

References

External links
Profile at IAAF.org

Australian male marathon runners
1968 births
Living people